Geraldão is a character created by Brazilian cartoonist Glauco Villas Boas and is the main character of a series of eponymous newspaper comic strip published since 1981. The character is an unmarried and unemployed middle-aged man who still lives in his mother's house. He is an alcoholic, smoker, sometimes walks naked and fights with his overbearing mother. The humor style of his strips is usually black comedy, and sometimes nonsensical. Being one of the few intended for mature audiences at the time, his comics have become classics.

The character has been published in comic books by various publishers with their characters. In the 90s the character also received a children's version and without the obscenity, but still nonsensical titled Geraldinho. This spin-off was adapted by Tectoy for a game in 1995 for the Master System, being an adaptation of the Japanese game Teddy Boy Blues.

The comics were discontinued in 2010 after Glauco's death.

References

Brazilian comic strips
1981 comics debuts
Humor comics
Fictional alcohol abusers
Fictional drug addicts
Fictional unemployed people
Fictional Brazilian people
Male characters in comics
Black comedy comics
Obscenity controversies in comics
Comics characters introduced in 1981
2010 comics endings